Does the World Hate the United States? is a 2005 book, edited by Andrea C. Nakaya. It is in the At Issue series of American textbooks, intended according to the publisher for grades 10 to 12+.

The book presents selections of viewpoints on questions about anti-Americanism, its extent and causes in relationship to its foreign policies and popular culture, and whether it is rooted in jealousy. It was published by Greenhaven Press (Farmington Hills) in 2005 as a 139-page hardcover and paperback.

Contents

Notes

External links
 Does the World Hate the United States? at the publisher's website.
 Does the World Hate the United States? at eNotes.

2005 non-fiction books
Books about foreign relations of the United States
Anti-Americanism
Greenhaven Press books